In United States law, jurisdiction-stripping (also called court-stripping or curtailment-of-jurisdiction), is the limiting or reducing of a court's jurisdiction by Congress through its constitutional authority to determine the jurisdiction of federal and state courts.

Basis
Congress may define the jurisdiction of the judiciary through the simultaneous use of two powers. First, Congress holds the power to create (and, implicitly, to define the jurisdiction of) federal courts inferior to the Supreme Court (i.e. Courts of Appeals, District Courts, and various other Article I and Article III tribunals).  This court-creating power is granted both in the congressional powers clause (Art. I, § 8, Cl. 9) and in the judicial vesting clause (Art. III, § 1). Second, Congress has the power to make exceptions to and regulations of the appellate jurisdiction of the Supreme Court.  This court-limiting power is granted in the Exceptions Clause (Art. III, § 2).  By exercising these powers in concert, Congress may effectively eliminate any judicial review of certain federal legislative or executive actions and of certain state actions, or alternatively transfer the judicial review responsibility to state courts by "knocking [federal courts] ... out of the game."

Alexander Hamilton had this to say about the issue in The Federalist:

From this review of the particular powers of the federal judiciary, as marked out in the Constitution, it appears that they are all conformable to the principles which ought to have governed the structure of that department, and which were necessary to the perfection of the system.  If some partial inconveniences should appear to be connected with the incorporation of any of them into the plan, it ought to be recollected that the national legislature will have ample authority to make such exceptions, and to prescribe such regulations as will be calculated to obviate or remove these inconveniences.

Transfer of authority to state judiciaries
Framers of the Constitution, such as Roger Sherman of Connecticut, did not envision jurisdiction stripping as invariably insulating a law from judicial review, and instead foresaw that state judiciaries could determine compatibility of certain types of state statutes with federal laws and the federal Constitution.  In 1788, Sherman publicly explained that,

It was thought necessary in order to carry into effect the laws of the Union, to promote justice, and preserve harmony among the states, to extend the judicial powers of the United States to the enumerated cases, under such regulations and with such exceptions as shall be provided by law, which will doubtless reduce them to cases of such magnitude and importance as cannot be safely trusted to the final decisions of the courts of particular states; and the constitution does not make it necessary that any inferior tribunals should be instituted, but it may be done if found necessary; 'tis probable that courts of particular states will be authorized by the laws of the union, as has heretofore been done in cases of piracy, &c. ...

Thus, there are two kinds of jurisdiction-stripping: one which changes the court that will hear the case (as Sherman envisioned), versus one which essentially insulates statutes from judicial review altogether.  Jurisdiction-stripping statutes usually take away no substantive rights but rather change the court that will hear the case.

Congress has sometimes limited federal involvement in state cases, for example by setting a minimum amount in controversy in order to bar the lower federal courts from hearing diversity cases that involve less than that amount (currently $75,000), combined with precluding a right to appeal to the Supreme Court. Likewise, Congress has never required that state court cases involving federal questions be removed or appealed to federal court, and so the federal courts are unable to exercise power in many of those cases.

Limits
Congress may not strip the U.S. Supreme Court of jurisdiction over those cases that fall under the Court's original jurisdiction defined in the U.S. Constitution. Congress can limit only the appellate jurisdiction of the Court. According to the Constitution, the Supreme Court has original jurisdiction in, "all Cases affecting Ambassadors, other public Ministers and Consuls, and those in which a State shall be Party. ... "  This last state-shall-be-a-party language has not been interpreted by the Court as meaning that it has original jurisdiction merely because a state is a plaintiff or defendant, even if a provision of the U.S. Constitution is at issue. Rather, the Court has stated that the controversy must be between two or more states, or between a state and citizens of another state, or between a state and foreigners.  Additionally, in 1892, the Court decided that it has original jurisdiction in cases between a state and the United States.

Story's theory
Justice Joseph Story, in his opinion in Martin v. Hunter's Lessee and in his other writings, wrote extensively about how Congress should ensure that the judicial power is properly vested in the federal courts.  Professor Akhil Amar credits Story with the theory that Congress may not concurrently remove the jurisdiction of inferior courts and the appellate jurisdiction of the Supreme Court over certain categories of claims, as doing so would violate the Constitution's mandatory grant of jurisdiction over such claims to the judiciary as a whole.  Story wrote in Martin v. Hunter's Lessee:

The judicial power shall extend to all the cases enumerated in the constitution.   As the mode is not limited, it may extend to all such cases, in any form, in which judicial power may be exercised.  It may, therefore, extend to them in the shape of original or appellate jurisdiction, or both; for there is nothing in the nature of the cases which binds to the exercise of the one in preference to the other.

According to Amar, Story's exposition of federal court jurisdiction "has generated considerable confusion" and furthermore, as Amar understands Story's theory, it "simply cannot be right".  Professor Henry M. Hart instead argued that Congress may strip the power of the federal judiciary to hear certain classes of cases. Hart wrote: "In the scheme of the Constitution [state courts] are the primary guarantors of constitutional rights, and in many cases they may be the ultimate ones."

Calabresi's theory
In 2007, law professors Steven Calabresi and Gary Lawson opined that Congress can strip the U.S. Supreme Court of appellate jurisdiction only to the extent that Congress expands the Court's original jurisdiction.  Calabresi and Lawson acknowledged that their theory contradicts the holding of Marbury v. Madison, according to which the Constitution's description of the Court's original jurisdiction is exhaustive.

According to Calabresi and Lawson, Congress has no ability to alter or make exceptions to the judicial power of the United States, or to do anything less than bring the full judicial power into execution.  The Calabresi theory finds support in a 2010 article by Washburn University Law Professor Alex Glashausser.  On the other hand, Judge William A. Fletcher wrote an article in 2010 taking the opposite point of view.

Related issues
Generally speaking, the word "power" is not necessarily synonymous with the word "jurisdiction".  For instance, courts will often assert a modest degree of power over a case for purposes of determining whether it has jurisdiction, or for purposes of receiving jurisdiction.

The Constitution vests the judicial power "in one supreme Court, and in such inferior courts as the Congress may from time to time establish" (emphasis added).  Scholars have debated whether the word "in" means that the entire judicial power is vested in the Supreme Court and is also vested entirely in the inferior courts; that possibility has implications for what the vesting of such power means.

Other relevant Supreme Court cases
During Reconstruction, Congress withdrew jurisdiction from a case the U.S. Supreme Court was then in the process of adjudicating.  In terminating the case Ex Parte McCardle, 74 US 506 (1869), the Justices acknowledged the authority of Congress to intervene.

We are not at liberty to inquire into the motives of the legislature.  We can only examine into its power under the Constitution; and the power to make exceptions to the appellate jurisdiction of this court is given by express words. ... It is quite clear, therefore, that this court cannot proceed to pronounce judgment in this case, for it has no longer jurisdiction of the appeal; and judicial duty is not less fitly performed by declining ungranted jurisdiction than in exercising firmly that which the Constitution and the laws confer.

In 1882, the Supreme Court again conceded that its own "actual jurisdiction is confined within such limits as Congress sees fit to describe."

In 1948, Supreme Court Justice Felix Frankfurter conceded in a dissenting opinion that "Congress need not give this Court any appellate power; it may withdraw appellate jurisdiction once conferred."

In 1972, Chief Justice Warren Burger made it known, concurring with the denial of certiorari to Volpe v. D. C. Federation of Civic Associations, that he believed Congress could do anything in its power to make its intentions clear, "even to the point of limiting or prohibiting judicial review of its directives in this respect." This was recorded in reference to a particular dispute with a court of appeal, which he accused of "unjustifiably frustrat[ing] the efforts of the Executive Branch to comply with the will of Congress." However, 10 days earlier, President Nixon had made a statement indicating his opposition to school busing for racial integration. In that context, Burger's statement was interpreted at the time as suggesting that Congress prohibit busing with legislation and enforce that legislation with jurisdiction stripping.

Further federal statutes
More recent examples of jurisdiction stripping include the following:

Illegal Immigration Reform and Immigrant Responsibility Act of 1996 (inter alia, stripped the federal judiciary of its jurisdiction to review certain Immigration and Naturalization Service decisions),
Prison Litigation Reform Act of 1996 (restricting the remedies available to prison inmates),
Antiterrorism and Effective Death Penalty Act of 1996 (limiting the number of habeas corpus petitions available to prison inmates),
Detainee Treatment Act of 2005, ruled as unconstitutional denial of the right of habeas corpus pursuant to the Suspension clause in the case of Hamdan v. Rumsfeld (2006).
Military Commissions Act of 2006 (Strip all Federal Courts of the U.S. jurisdiction to hear appeal or cases from Guantanamo Bay Detainee) Ruled Unconstitutional in the case of Boumediene v. Bush (2008).

There have also been hundreds of unsuccessful bills in Congress to strip federal courts of jurisdiction.

See also
Ouster clause
Separation of powers under the United States Constitution

References

Jurisdiction
United States constitutional law
Federal judiciary of the United States
Terminology of the United States Congress
Political terminology of the United States